The Ven. Walter Heard  was Archdeacon of Berbice from 1894 until 1907.

Heard was educated at St Augustine's College, Canterbury and ordained in 1871. After curacies at All Saints, Berbice and St Jude, Berbice heheld incumbencies at Skeldon, Suddie and New Amsterdam.

He retired to Saint Aubin, Jersey.

References

19th-century Guyanese Anglican priests
20th-century Guyanese Anglican priests
Archdeacons of Berbice